Willeya laevigata is a species of saxicolous (rock-dwelling), crustose lichen in the family Verrucariaceae. Found in northwest Vietnam, it was formally described as a new species in 2014 by Cécile Gueidan. The type specimen was found growing on shaded calcareous rock outcrops in a rainforest in the Mai Châu district of Hòa Bình province. The species epithet laevigata refers to the smooth upper surface of the thallus.

References

Verrucariales
Lichen species
Lichens described in 2014
Lichens of Indo-China
Taxa named by Cécile Gueidan